Internationalists may refer to:

 Internationalism (politics), a movement to increase cooperation across national borders
 Internationalism, a current within the socialist movement opposed to World War I
 Our Favourite Shop, second album by The Style Council, released in the USA as Internationalists